English DJ Jax Jones has released one studio album, three EPs and twenty singles, including one as a featured artist. His debut album Snacks (Supersize) was released on 6 September 2019.

Studio albums

Extended plays

Singles

As lead artist

As featured artist

Production and songwriting credits

Remixes

Notes

References